Shanghai International Music Fireworks Festival started in 2000 and is held annually on National Day. The fireworks are fired from 7 barges and the other side of a lake in ShangHai Century Park. All fireworks are produced in China and they are designed by invited companies/designers.

References

Culture in Shanghai
2000 establishments in China
Recurring events established in 2000
Annual events in Shanghai
Fireworks events in Asia
Festivals in China
Festivals established in 2000
Autumn events in China